Ndejje is a hill in Central Uganda. Ndejje also refers to the trading center that has developed along the southern slopes of Ndejje Hill.

Location

Population
The exact population of Ndejje is not known at this time. However, Barnabus Iga Matovu, a journalist from the area, in 2012 gave the estimate population of Ndejje as over 10,000 (in a news article in a local newspaper). Matovu says the population has rapidly increased from that of about 1,000 people after the NRM Liberation war (1981–86) due to the rise of schools in the area specifically the university. The trading center also has attracted many people from villages around and land has become expensive.

Points of Interest
The points of interest on Ndejje Hill or near its borders include the following:

 Ndejje Trading Center - A collection of shops and residential houses
 The Main Campus of Ndejje University - The university occupies two pieces of property on the hill, totaling .
 The Lady Irene Campus of Ndejje University - The university has two campuses on Ndejje Hill and a third campus on Namirembe Hill in southwest Kampala, Uganda's capital city.
 Ndejje Senior Secondary School - A public, mixed, boarding school founded in 1960, affiliated with the Church of Uganda.
 Nalinnya Lwantale Girls Senior Secondary School
 Ndejje Day Vocational Senior Secondary School
 Ndejje High School
 Hope Primary School

External links
  Website of Ndejje University

See also
Bombo
Luweero
Semuto
Luweero District
Central Region, Uganda

References

Luweero District
Populated places in Central Region, Uganda